The Progressive Party, known as the Minjung Party until June 2020, is a left-wing progressive and nationalist political party in South Korea. The party was formed by the merger of the New People's Party and People's United Party on 15 October 2017.

History 

The party initially had two members in the National Assembly, both from Ulsan, but was reduced to one on 22 December, when the supreme court convicted Yoon Jong-oe for breaking the campaign law.

In July 2018, members of the Minjung Party met with members of the North Korean Social Democratic Party in China. The meeting was not authorized by the Ministry of Unification which could have punished the party for violations of South Korea's National Security Act. Jung Tae-heung, the co-chair of the Minjung Party, stated that he was warned the party may be fined for the meeting.

In August 2019, the party held events related to nationwide protests against Japanese prime minister Shinzo Abe and boycott against Japanese products.

In January 2020, the Minjung Party surveyed at 1.5% approval rating ahead of parliamentary elections.

The party lost its remaining seat in the 2020 legislative election.

The Minjung Party tried to participate in the Platform Party, a proportional party of the Democratic Party of Korea (DPK). However, the Democratic Party of Korea refused to join forces with the Minjung Party.

In June 2020, the party renamed itself from the Minjung Party to the Progressive Party.

Some members of the Progressive Party were investigated for planning anti-American and anti-government activities by contacting North Korean spies and receiving orders from North Korea. The Progressive Party protested that it was a crackdown on progressive camps. Some media outlets, such as the liberal Kyunghyang Shinmun, expressed concerns through editorials that the (right-wing Yoon Suk-yeol) government was pressuring labor unions and civic groups, as well as creating a public security state through counterintelligence investigations.

Political positions 

Although the party has never officially put forward socialism or anti-capitalism, it is classified by some media outlets as "far-left" in the context of South Korean politics. The Progressive Party has "progressivism" as its main ideology rather than "socialism". 

This party opposes restricting the labor of senior citizens over 60. This is because South Korea is not a European welfare state, so there is a livelihood problem for the elderly. Most socialists in the South Korea consider it a "liberal" party and not "left-wing" party.

The Progressive Party strongly supports direct democracy so that 'Minjung' can actively participate in politics, and is also evaluated as "radical" or "radical-left". 

This party takes a minjokjuui stance toward North Korea and a civic nationalist stance toward immigrants and naturalized citizens. They believe that minjokjuui is anti-racism ideology because it is a "resistant" politics, and that it is possible to coexist with multiculturalism.

Economic policy 
The party supports the redistribution of wealth and economically progressive positions such as imposing a 90% tax rate on more than 3 billion won (roughly US$2,500,000).

In addition, the party sees chaebol very negatively and sees "decomposing the monopoly economy of transnational capital and chaebols" as its official party theory.

Foreign policy 
The Progressive Party is an anti-imperialist party. The party generally shows a strong left-wing nationalism tendency and is much more conciliatory to North Korea than mainstream left-liberals in South Korea, and the party argues that the remnants of colonialism from the Japanese imperialist era should be liquidated and unequal South Korea-U.S. relations should be dismantled to establish national sovereignty.

The Progressive Party issued an "anti-Japan joint statement" (반일공동성명) with the Korean Social Democratic Party in 2019. The Progressive Party has the most resistant nationalist and anti-Japanese tendencies among South Korea's major political parties.

North Korea 
They oppose all forms of sanctions against North Korea. The party's politicians say only the complete lifting of sanctions on North Korea brings peace on the Korean Peninsula. In March 2022, suspicions arose that some party officials were operating in South Korea while receiving orders from North Korea, and an investigation was launched. The Progressive Party denied that they had ever received orders.

International exchange with American progressives 
The Progressive Party is known as an anti-American party, but they do not oppose everything in the U.S. and argue that what they call "반미" is just "against American imperialism".

On October 13, 2017, when the founding ceremony of the Minjung Party was held, American progressives such as Ramsey Clark and Noam Chomsky celebrated the founding of the party by supporting pacifism on the Korean Peninsula. This party also contacted American progressives such as Jesse Jackson and Bernie Sanders in 2018 to draw support for the "declaration of the end of the Korean Peninsula" (종전선언).

Social policy 
Major politicians of the Progressive Party support  a volunteer military system. The party also supports women's rights, LGBT rights, youth politics and labor-oriented politics.  The party actively supports the feminist movement in South Korea. Kim Jae-yeon said the reason for running for the 2022 Korean presidential election was "to become a feminist president".

Rights of immigrants and multiculturalism 
The Progressive Party is a Korean nationalist party, but it shows supports for multiculturalism and immigration, aiming for "resistance nationalism'" instead of "right-wing nationalism". In addition, the Progressive Party opposes neoliberalism, believing it promotes discrimination against immigrants.

The Progressive Party, along with human rights groups, accused the Moon Jae-in government's COVID-19 quarantine policy in March 2021 of being discriminatory against foreign workers.

Controversy over the far-left label 
The Progressive Party is usually classified as "far-left" in South Korean media; however, the Progressive Party does not officially advocate general far-left ideologies such as anti-capitalism, left-wing terrorism, communism or anarchism in the context of international politics. The Progressive Party supports the restoration of South Korea's sovereignty and full "independence" in the international community. The term "independence" here means strong support for hostile foreign policies against Japan, active reunification policy with North Korea, opposition to free trade with neighboring powers, protectionism, and establishment of completely equal diplomatic relations between countries.

The main reason why PP is classified as "far-left" in the South Korean political context is anti-Americanism. The PP sees South Korea's socio-economic contradictions as the main cause of the U.S. rather than China/Japan, and thus supports the "anti-American struggle" (반미투쟁). This is therefore a crucial difference from mainstream liberals like DPK and JP, who are negative for China/Japan and are somewhat friendly to the United States to counter their China/Japan hegemonism. In particular, the PP argues for the "Dissolution of the U.S.-South Korea alliance" (한미동맹 파기).

Democratic socialists in South Korea, including the Labor Party, criticized the Justice Party and Progressive Party as merely "liberal", not "progressive"; however, due to the difference in diplomatic views between the two parties, the Labor Party is considered more moderate than the Progressive Party in the context of South Korean politics. Some equate the Progressive Party's line with the Justice Party and the Labor Party's centre-left social democracy.

For this reason, on Namuwiki, the most popular wiki in South Korea, an editorial battle took place over the political position of the Minjung Party and the Progressive Party, and eventually a "Talk" forum was held. The conflict stemmed from a dispute between editors over whether or not the party could be accurately described as "far left". However, Namuwiki's administrator concluded that it was right to define the political position of Minjung Party and the Progressive Party as "far-left".

Controversy 
The merger of the New People's Party and People's United Party has been controversial, due to their status as parties that were largely a continuation of the Unified Progressive Party, which was dissolved and banned in 2014 due to purported pro-North Korean and "anti-constitutional" activity by a Constitutional Court ruling. Conservative critics of the party argued that the Minjung Party is merely an attempt to reestablish the Unified Progressive Party.

Election results

Presidential

Local

Logos

See also 

 Postcolonialism
 Han (cultural)
 Voice of the People (website)
 Minjung
 Undongkwon
 Hanchongnyon
 2019 boycott of Japanese products in South Korea

Notes

References

External links 
 Official website
 Namuwiki — Minjung Party (2017) and Progressive Party (2020) 
 Official YouTube channel 

2017 establishments in South Korea
Political parties established in 2017
Anti-imperialism in Korea
Anti-imperialist organizations
Anti-Japanese sentiment in South Korea
Anti-sadaejuui
Anti-Zionism in South Korea
Chaebol
Civic nationalism
Direct democracy parties
Economic progressivism
Far-left politics in South Korea
Feminist organizations in South Korea
Feminist parties in Asia
Identity politics in Korea
Immigration political advocacy groups in South Korea
Korean nationalist parties
Left-wing nationalism in South Korea
Left-wing nationalist parties
Left-wing parties in South Korea
Left-wing populism
LGBT political advocacy groups in South Korea
Minjung
Postcolonialism
Populism in South Korea
Progressive parties in South Korea
Radical parties
Youth politics in South Korea